Alfred Frank "Fred" Paoli (born February 18, 1954) is an American former rugby union and American football player who played prop for the United States men's rugby national team and college football for Colorado State as a defensive lineman. During his rugby career, Paoli played 20 test matches for the USA Eagles but never scored a try. His final game was in 1991 against Italy in the 1991 Rugby World Cup.

Paoli is a trial attorney and is certified to practice law in Colorado and Montana.

References

External links

1954 births
Living people
United States international rugby union players
Colorado State Rams football players
Rugby union props